Ithu Njangalude Katha is a 1982 Malayalam film made in India, by P. G. Viswambharan. This was the second film of actor Mukesh after the 1981 film Balloon. This film is a remake of the Tamil film Palaivana Solai.

Plot
The lives of five friends are caught as they fall in love with the same girl.

Cast
Shanthi Krishna... Prabha
Sreenath... Raghu 
Mukesh... Ramankutty 
Jagathy Sreekumar... Vasu  
Manianpilla Raju... Santhosh
Santhosh... Joseph
Sukumari... Naniyamma 
Santhakumari... Joseph's Mother 
Thikkurisi Sukumaran Nair... Ramankutty's Uncle 
Jose Prakash... Mathachan  
P. G. Viswambharan... Himself

Soundtrack
The music was composed by Johnson and the lyrics were written by P. Bhaskaran.

References

External links
 
 https://web.archive.org/web/20120407115135/http://popcorn.oneindia.in/title/8045/ithu-njangalude-katha.html

1980s Malayalam-language films
1980s teen romance films
1982 films
Films directed by P. G. Viswambharan
Malayalam remakes of Tamil films
Films shot in Thiruvananthapuram